The Domica cave is situated on the south-western border of the Silicka planina Plateau  south-east of Plesivec in the Rožňava District of the Košice Region in southern Slovakia and in combination with the Baradla cave represents the most significant section of the Aggtelek Karst and Slovak Karst cross-border cave network that continues into the (Aggtelek National Park) in Hungary.

These vast limestone passages, that had formed during the Middle Triassic and are rich in speleothems were discovered in 1926 by Ján Majko.

As an element of the Caves of Aggtelek Karst and Slovak Karst the site has been induced into the UNESCO World Heritage list in 1995.

Exploration

The site belongs to a complex variety of formations that include 712 caves, many of which were well known among the local population for centuries. Bartholomeides, a priest from Ochtiná documented his first systematic excursions into the Certova diera Cave in 1801. His conclusions that a number of local caves are simply parts of a bigger entity were corroborated by the explorer I.Vass, who surveyed the Baradla cave in 1821. E.Nyari took up archaeological work in 1881 and suggested a connection of the Certova diera and Baradla Cave as did K. Siegmenth in 1891. Only the extensive work of Jan Majko in 1926 confirmed the interconnection of several local caves and lead to the discovery of the Domica cave on October 3, 1926. J. Majko penetrated from its bottom through a 15 m deep abyss into large underground spaces in 1926 where plenty of archaeological discoveries were made later.

Description

The Domica Cave is situated in the Slovak karst and consists of light limestone of the Middle Triassic. The passages were shaped by the waters of an underground river, called Styx. Speleothem decoration is omnipresent and very impressive, including  cascades of stalactite lakes, variously shaped stalactites domed temples and notably bat guano, that had diffused into sinter crusts accounts for unique forms and textures of surface decoration.

Karst processes have over tens of millions of years created diverse structures and habitats that date back to the Late Cretaceous. Subsequent periods of temperate, glacial, subtropical and tropical climatic conditions excellently demonstrate karst formation under varying conditions. Biologists, geologists and paleontologists are confronted with a rich set of various conditions, that affect sedimentation, evolution and fossilization in a geological time frame.

Gallery

Human occupation

Jaroslav Böhm directed excavations during the 1930s. Human presence has been documented dating back to the Paleolithic. The cave had presumably been a casual refuge for the oldest Neolithic inhabitants of Eastern Slovakia. However, the cave has been frequented by  Neolithic humans of the Bükk culture, who might even have manufactured their distinct thin-walled pottery inside the cave. The original entrance of the Domica Cave was blocked by debris after Paleo-humans had abandoned it and the cave became inaccessible.

Post holes from dwelling objects and fireplaces were discovered in several places of the cave. More than 200 reconstructed containers from sherds as well as a terrace-dug slope in a fine-grained loam on the Styx bank with imprints of stone axes are evidences of ceramics manufacture in the cave. Irons, awls, arrows, the oldest comb in Europe, ring, decorated cylinder bracelet and fishhook represent the peak of Neolithic processing of bones. Also pendants from shells and animal teeth were preserved.

See also
 Krásnohorská Cave
 Škocjan Caves in Slovenia

References

External links

 WHC Nomination Documentation
 Domica Cave at Slovak Caves Administration
 Domica on the Slovak Caves Association page

1801 archaeological discoveries
Show caves in Slovakia
World Heritage Sites in Slovakia
Geography of Košice Region
Tourist attractions in Košice Region
Archaeological sites in Slovakia
Ramsar sites in Slovakia
Triassic Europe
Paleolithic sites
Caves of Aggtelek Karst and Slovak Karst